"Hand in Hand" is a song by South Korean band Koreana that was the official theme song of the 1988 Summer Olympics held in Seoul, South Korea. It was sung in both Korean and English. The song was produced by Giorgio Moroder. Its English lyrics were written by Tom Whitlock, its Korean lyrics by Kim Moon-hwan. 

The song topped music charts in 17 countries, including Sweden, West Germany, the Philippines, Spain, Switzerland, Austria, Japan and Hong Kong. The album Hand in Hand sold more than 12 million copies worldwide. It has since been translated and covered several times.

In 2013, Giorgio Moroder said that the original singer of the demo recording which he presented to PolyGram was Joe Pizzulo, not Koreana.

Charts

Cover versions and cultural references
A Cantonese version of the song, called 一呼百應 (Yat hu bat ying, many people respond to one call), performed by Hong Kong singers Timothy Wong and Pearl Lee.
A Swedish version, called "Jul i vinterland" (Eng. Christmas in Winterland"), with lyrics by Keith Almgren, has been recorded by Wizex in 1988 on Christmas compilation albums and on single in 1991.
On August 14, 2016, South Korean girl group I.O.I released a digital single and remake of the song.
In Venezuela, the group Papel Carbón made a version of this song in Spanish.

The original song appeared in an episode of Pingu called Ice Hockey.

References

1988 Summer Olympics
Olympic theme songs
Summer Olympic official songs and anthems
1988 songs
I.O.I songs
Songs written by Tom Whitlock
Songs written by Giorgio Moroder
Number-one singles in Sweden
Number-one singles in Germany